Just Tattoo of Us is an MTV British entertainment reality tattoo programme that follows couples, friends, or family members as they go to the Just Tattoo of Us parlour to design each other's tattoo. Announced in November 2016 by MTV the series began airing on 3 April 2017 and has aired a total of four series of the show up to 6 May 2019, a fifth series has been confirmed and began on 18 November 2019. In March 2020, it was confirmed by MTV that the show would be rested to make room for new upcoming shows.

Summary
The show follows Charlotte Crosby and Stephen Bear as they open the doors to the 'Just Tattoo of Us' tattoo parlour in London. In each episode, pairs of friends, family members, or couples enter the parlour and explain to Bear and Crosby their relationship and the reasoning behind entering the show. They then individually visit the tattoo artist who has made a design for the other person based on a brief previously sent in. However, in this parlour, everyone who arrives will be getting a tattoo but will not have any say in what it is, as it will be designed by their friend, partner or family member who they came with, and the same will be done the other way round. After the designs are finished, everyone comes together for the reveal where the tattoos are finally seen. The participants then give their feedback on their tattoo, and Crosby and Bear also share their opinions.

Cast
This is a list of current and former presenters and tattooists on MTV's Just Tattoo of Us.

Key
  = Presenter 
  = Tattooist 
  = Guest presenter 

Guest Presenters (episode they presented)

 Danny Robinson (Series 1 Episode 8)
Matt Richardson (Series 1 Episode 9)
 Charl Davies (Series 3 Episode 2)

Guest Co-Presenters (episode(s) they co-presented with Charlotte Crosby)

Josh Ritchie (Series 4 Episode 1, Series 4 Episode 5, Series 4 Episode 10)
 Charl Davies (Series 4 Episode 2)
 Chloe Ferry (Series 4 Episode 3, Series 4 Episode 7)
 Joey Essex (Series 4 Episode 4, Series 4 Episode 8)
 Aaron Chalmers (Series 4 Episode 6, Series 4 Episode 12)
 Lateysha Grace (Series 4 Episode 9, Series 5 Episode 1+2)
 Nathan Henry (Series 4 Episode 11)

Development and production
In November 2016, MTV and Charlotte Crosby announced, via social media, a new reality tattoo series titled Just Tattoo of Us, presented by Stephen Bear and Crosby. The series was filmed in early 2017 for a 3 April broadcast. It was announced on This Morning that Crosby and Bear had decided to take part in the series as well by designing a tattoo for each other on the final episode of the series.

It was announced on 24 April 2017 that MTV had ordered a second series of Just Tattoo of Us. The second series began filming on 20 May 2017. It was also confirmed that Charlotte and Stephen would be returning as hosts. The second series began airing on 2 October 2017 and concluded on 4 December 2017.

It was confirmed that Just Tattoo of Us would return for a third series in 2018. It was announced that Stephen Bear would be replaced by Scotty T in series three. The third series began airing on 21 May 2018 and concluded on 23 July 2018. It also marked the first series to broadcast the episodes in non-chronological order.

It was confirmed that Just Tattoo of Us would return for a fourth series at the end of 2018. It was also confirmed that Charlotte Crosby would present alongside special guest presenters due to Scotty T quitting the show to rejoin Geordie Shore. The guest presenters included: Josh Ritchie, Aaron Chalmers, Chloe Ferry, Nathan Henry, Lateysha Grace, Joey Essex and Charl Davies. The fourth series began airing on 29 October 2018. For the first time in the shows history, this series was split in two. The final episode of part one aired on 3 December 2018, and the first episode of part two aired on 1 April 2019 and concluded on 6 May 2019.

Episodes

Series overview

Series 1 (2017) 
It was announced in November 2016 that MTV had announced that Geordie Shore star Charlotte Crosby and Ex on the Beach star Stephen Bear would present a new reality tattoo show to air in 2017, the first series began airing on MTV on 3 April and concluded on 29 May 2017.

Ratings (series 1)

Series 2 (2017) 
It was announced on 24 April 2017 that MTV had ordered a series to air later in the year. It was also confirmed that Charlotte and Stephen would both return as host for the second series, filming began on 20 May 2017. It was confirmed that all the tattooists would be returning. The second series will begin on 2 October 2017. The second series will see a new Tattooist Jen join the show. Series two was the last series to have Stephen Bear as presenter due to him leaving the show at the end of filming for the second series.

Ratings (series 2)

Series 3 (2018)
It was announced on 14 August 2017 that Just Tattoo of Us was renewed for a third series. The series will begin to air on 21 August 2018. Charlotte Crosby who will be returning for her third series. The third series will see Scotty T join the show as Charlotte's co-presenter due to Bear quitting the series in Series Two. The third series will also see a 2 new Tattooists Hue & Jason join the show, replacing Atom & John.

The episodes in this series were not broadcast in chronological order as seen in the table below.

Series 4 (2018–2019)
Series four will begin airing on 29 October 2018, Charlotte Crosby will return to present the show alongside special guest presenters as Scotty T has quit the show (to rejoin Geordie Shore), the guest presenters will include Josh Ritchie, Aaron Chalmers, Chloe Ferry, Nathan Henry, Lateysha Grace, Joey Essex and Charl Davies. Stefan-Pierre Tomlin, also known as Mr Tinder for his most right-swiped status on the dating app, starred in the opening episode. The tattoo artist line-up will be similar to the third series however Jennafer Lee has quit the show and will be replaced by returning artist John Smith.

Series 5 (2019–2020)
Series five began on 18 November 2019, Charlotte Crosby returns to present the show alongside special guest presenters again, returning guest presenters from the fourth series are Josh Ritchie, Chloe Ferry, Lateysha Grace and Joey Essex. Charlotte Dawson and Olivia Attwood will join the cast as new guest presenters. The fifth series saw the biggest change in the tattoo artist line-up with Cally-Jo, Danny Robinson, Jodie Davies and John Smith all leaving the show, with the only returning artists from Series Four being Charl Davies, Hue Nguyen and Jason Best. They are joined by 4 new artists; Emma Callaghan, Freddie Albrighton, Jade Channel and Jamie Winters.

Also the series added a twist titled "Stick or Twist" where the client could stick with their chosen tattoo or twist and have a completely random unknown tattoo designed by the artist, this could either be better or worse than the original design.

International versions

References

External links
 
 
 

2017 British television series debuts
2010s British reality television series
2020s British reality television series
English-language television shows
MTV reality television series
Tattooing television series
Television series about couples
Television series about families
Television series about show business
Television series by All3Media
Television shows set in London